Wayne A. Stewart (born August 18, 1947 in Cochrane, Canada) is a former AFL and NFL tight end.

He grew up in Downey, California, and attended the University of California. He was drafted by the American Football League's New York Jets, 390th overall in the 1969 Common Draft. He played one year for the AFL Jets, three years for the Jets in the NFL, and one year for the NFL San Diego Chargers. Combined he played 52 games, making 27 catches for 355 yards and two touchdowns.

See also
 Other American Football League players

1947 births
Living people
Canadian players of American football
New York Jets players
American football tight ends
California Golden Bears football players
American people of Canadian descent
Sportspeople from Downey, California
American Football League players